Teofil Cyprian Wolicki (1768–1829) was an 18th-century Primate of Poland and Bishop of Poznań and Włocławek.

Life
He was born 30 October 1768 in Doruchów.

He graduated from Seminary in Warsaw, and ordained a priest. Then he studied law and theology at the Academy of Vilnius and in Rome.

After his return to Poland, he worked in the Office of the Crown Chancellery and a library of Stanisław August Poniatowski, under the direction of Bishop John Baptist Albertrandi.

He became Archbishop of Gniezno on 17 May 1829.

He died December 21, 1829 in Poznań.

References

External links
 Virtual tour Gniezno Cathedral 
List of Primates of Poland 

Archbishops of Gniezno
1768 births
1829 deaths
Bishops of Poznań
Bishops of Kujawy and Włocławek
Catholic clergy of the Prussian partition